Zvolen District (okres Zvolen) is a district in
the Banská Bystrica Region of central Slovakia. Until 1918, most of the present-day district belonged to the Zvolen county, apart from Lešť in the south-west which was part of the county of Gemer a Malohont.

Municipalities 
Babiná
Bacúrov
Breziny
Budča
Bzovská Lehôtka
Dobrá Niva
Dubové
Hronská Breznica
Kováčová
Lešť
Lieskovec
Lukavica
Michalková
Očová
Ostrá Lúka
Pliešovce
Podzámčok
Sása
Sielnica
Sliač
Tŕnie
Turová
Veľká Lúka
Zvolen
Zvolenská Slatina
Železná Breznica

Districts of Slovakia
1918 establishments in Czechoslovakia
Geography of Banská Bystrica Region